Charles William Kraft Jr. (December 14, 1903 – January 18, 2002) was a United States district judge of the United States District Court for the Eastern District of Pennsylvania.

Education and career

Born in Philadelphia, Pennsylvania, Kraft received an Artium Baccalaureus degree from the University of Pennsylvania in 1924, a Bachelor of Laws from the University of Pennsylvania Law School in 1927, and a Juris Doctor from the same institution in 1930. He was in private practice in Media, Pennsylvania from 1927 to 1955. He was District Attorney of Delaware County, Pennsylvania from 1944 to 1952.

Federal judicial service

Kraft received a recess appointment from President Dwight D. Eisenhower on August 12, 1955, to the United States District Court for the Eastern District of Pennsylvania, to a new seat created by 68 Stat. 8. He was nominated to the same seat by President Eisenhower on January 12, 1956. He was confirmed by the United States Senate on March 28, 1956, and received his commission the next day.  He was succeeded by Judge Clarence Charles Newcomer. He assumed senior status on November 11, 1970. Kraft served in that capacity until his death on January 18, 2002, in Key Biscayne, Florida.

References

Sources
 

1903 births
2002 deaths
Lawyers from Philadelphia
Judges of the United States District Court for the Eastern District of Pennsylvania
United States district court judges appointed by Dwight D. Eisenhower
20th-century American judges
University of Pennsylvania Law School alumni